Kerjäläisten valtakunta (The Realm of Beggars) is a 1985 album by the Finnish rock band Dingo. It is the fourth-best-selling album of all-time in Finland.

Track listing

Certifications

See also
List of best-selling albums in Finland

References

1985 albums
Dingo (band) albums
Finnish-language albums